XM2 may refer to:

 XM-2 Roll, a satellite for XM satellite radio
 XMX (XM) (aka XM2), a satellite radio channel for XM satellite radio
 Canon XM2, a camcorder
 Citroën XM 2.0, a French automobile
 South African type XM2 tender, a steam locomotive tender
 Moller XM-2, a VTOL aircraft; see List of aircraft (Mo)
 XM2, a prototype version of the Bradley Fighting Vehicle
 XM-2, a U.S. Army Vietnam War era sensor 
 XM-2, a U.S. X-ray microscope for soft X-ray microscopy, the first such for biological samples
 XMII (aka XM 2), 2005 album by Porcupine Tree

See also

 RTÉ 2XM, Irish radio station
 XM2go, a portable XM satellite radio receiver
 
 XM (disambiguation)
 XMM (disambiguation)
 XMZ (disambiguation)